The Mountsorrel Railway was a network of industrial railway lines that served the granite quarries which dominate the Leicestershire village of Mountsorrel. After being closed in the 1950s, a section was reopened in 2015 as a heritage line run by Mountsorrel & Rothley Community Heritage Centre.

History 

The engineer was Mr. Addison of London, the contractor was Mr. Herbert of Leicester and the cost of construction was £18,000.

By the turn of the century there were eight-and-a-half miles of track serving the local quarries, now owned by Tarmac.  

The line was extended and by 1898 ran from the Great Central Railway at Swithland Sidings.

The line fell out of use in the 1950s, the track was taken up in the 1960s, and most of the route was abandoned. Part of the 'main-line' is now covered by a conveyor belt which runs from Mountsorrel Quarry to the site of the junction on the Midland Main Line, near Barrow upon Soar. The conveyor belt replaced the original railway in the 1970s.

Restoration 

A local resident, Steve Cramp, had been researching the railway and, as well as writing a book about it, led the project to rebuild the part of the railway going from Swithland to Mountsorrel. Donations came in for the project, including from Lafarge. The project reinstated one-and-a-quarter miles of new track to a small halt station under Bond Lane bridge. This enables the villagers of Mountsorrel to catch a train for nearby  and then onto the rest of the preserved network. The line climbs at a grade of 1-in-62, which is far steeper than the gradients on the Great Central Mainline, as they reached only 1-in-175.

Despite numerous examples, none of the original Mountsorrel wagons had been preserved, so three wooden-bodied open wagons (two 5-plank bodies and one 3-plank) which closely resembled the old ones were selected to be returned to service in the official light grey livery of the old Mountsorrel Granite Company.

Open days had been held on the trackbed since May 2009, involving ecology groups and track bed 'tours among' children and adults. When finished, the plan is to provide the Great Central Railway with a secondary attraction, recreating various scenes from the past, including a time when children would ride in the open wagons on Sundays and days out.

By 2010, the group had completed ballast laying over the first mile from the junction with the GCR to Wood Lane. On 10 May 2010, the track work began with the placement of a right-handed point at Swithland Sidings, the first part of the new junction. In June, the group received a £5000 donation from the Great Central's support charity, bringing them closer to their goal to complete the track laying. 

By May 2011, track had been laid over the first 300m of the branch line, which allowed the first trains to run on the railway since the track lifting trains in 1959. The group are currently in the process of fund raising for £16,000 to allow the next 450m of track to be laid.

By the end of April 2012, phase 2 had been completed, with a further 250-300m laid and many hedgerows planted, and fund raising for phase three was well underway (£11,000 of £23,000 raised so far). This will allow laying of the next 500m of track and take the track to Wood Lane, on the outskirts of Mountsorrel.

In early December 2012, track-laying passed through the bridge at Wood Lane. Materials had also been secured to reach the end of the line at Bond Lane. By this time, total project spend had been £90,000, with £9,500 still to be raised to complete the track to passenger-carrying standards.

The preserved line 
On 21 November 2013, the first passenger train travelled the railway towards Mountsorrel hauling the project volunteers. Project leader Steve Cramp said on the day that "It’s been an emotional time for us all, everybody has worked so hard over the last six years to bring this vision to reality and it’s so nice to actually see a steam train get back up to Mountsorrel."

On 27 January 2014, planning permission for a simple  platform built into the base of the cutting next to the bridge at Bond Lane was granted by Charnwood Borough Council. The platform was constructed from concrete blocks faced with Mountsorrel Granite. The aim for the new platform was to link up with Stonehurst Family Farm and Motor Museum bringing together the local community. The Platform is now known as Mountsorrel railway station.

After eight years and over 80,000 hours of volunteer time, the Mountsorrel Railway was opened to the public over the weekend of 24 and 25 October 2015 by Lord Faulkner of Worcester, who is president of the Heritage Railway Association and vice chairman of the Science Museum.

The site of the former Nunckley Quarry now occupies Mountsorrel and Rothley Community Heritage Centre, which includes a coffee shop, heritage displays, a railway museum, a recreation of a Stonemasons' hut, like those that would have been used in Mountsorrel Quarry, a demonstrative narrow gauge railway and Nunckley Hill railway station.

, funds are needed for the construction of the Discovery Centre, a brand new building which will include teaching an even-more in-depth history of the local area and will be supplemented with an exhibition area, a library with archive storage, a lecture theatre/class room, a study room, advanced AR equipment for 'hands-on' learning and a large lobby. There is also the need for donations to complete the Railway Museum Extension, which will serve as a restoration area for rolling-stock, as well as the new extension of the Nunckley Narrow Gauge Railway, which also needs new track.

Locomotives and rolling stock

Locomotives 
The last surviving locomotive of the original railway is a Peckett and Sons 0-4-0ST Works No. 1759 Elizabeth of 1928 currently undergoing restoration at Rutland Railway Museum in Cottesmore, with ambitions to bring it back to the railway once restored.

Wagons

Coaches

See also 
List of heritage railways

References

External links 
 Mountsorrel & Rothley Community Heritage Centre

Rail transport in Leicestershire
Transport in Leicestershire
Great Central Railway
Great Central Railway (preserved)
Heritage railways in Leicestershire